Pededze Parish is an administrative unit of Alūksne Municipality, Latvia. It contains the tri-border between Estonia, Latvia and Russia

Towns, villages and settlements of Pededze Parish 

Parishes of Latvia
Alūksne Municipality